International Animation Cartoon Festival Bangladesh (IACFB) is an annual international animation film festival in Bangladesh. The first edition of the festival took place on 29 March 2013 at the Shishu Academy in Dhaka. Children Communication Bangladesh (CCB) has been organizing this festival based on the theme Shishura Shajabey Notun Prithibi Md. Rabiul Islam Rony, Director, CCB South Asia plans to host the first international animation festival in Bangladesh among the SAARC countries.

References 

Bangladeshi animation
Film festivals in Bangladesh